The Fuqing Nuclear Power Plant is a nuclear power plant in Fuqing, Fujian Province, China. 
The plant is located on the coast of Xinghua Bay, near Qianxue Village, Sanshan Town. 
The station has four 1,089 megawatt (MW) CPR-1000 pressurized water reactors (PWRs). 
The CPR-1000 is an advanced PWR design developed by China from the Areva-designed PWRs at the Daya Bay Nuclear Power Plant.
The plant was jointly constructed and is operated by China National Nuclear Corporation (51%), China Huadian Corp. (39%) and the Fujian Investment & Development Co Ltd. (10%).

Construction of the first unit began on 21 November 2008 and was completed in 2014.
First concrete for Unit 2 was poured on 17 June 2009 and the unit was started in October 2015.
First concrete for Unit 3 was poured on 31 December 2010. 
Construction of Unit 4 was to begin in 2011, but was delayed until November 2012 by China's nuclear safety review following the Fukushima nuclear disaster.

In November 2014 it was announced that units 5 and 6 would be of the Hualong One (updated CPR-1000) design, with unit 5 scheduled to be in operation about 2019. 
The first concrete was poured for Fuqing 5 on 7 May 2015. Unit 5 achieved criticality in October 2020, the first Hualong One reactor to reach the milestone. The unit was connected to the grid the following month. It began commercial operation on 30 January 2021.
Unit 6 achieved criticality in December 2021, was connected to the grid in January 2022, and began commercial operation on 25 March 2022.

Reactor data
The Fuqing Nuclear Power Plant consist of 5 operational reactors, and 1 reactor under construction.

See also

Nuclear power in China
List of nuclear reactors#China

References

Nuclear power stations in China
Buildings and structures in Fujian
Buildings and structures in Fuzhou
Nuclear power stations using CPR-1000 reactors
2013 establishments in China
Nuclear power stations with reactors under construction
Nuclear power stations with proposed reactors
Fuqing